A list of films produced by the Bollywood film industry based in Mumbai in 1946:

Highest-grossing films
The five highest-grossing films at the Indian Box Office in 1946:

A-B

C-G

H-J

K-L

M-O

P-R

S-Z

References

External links
 Bollywood films of 1946 at the Internet Movie Database

1946
Bollywood
Films, Bollywood